Final tables of the Lithuanian Championship in 1991 are presented below. Lithuanian Football Federation (LFF) organizes three football leagues: A Lyga (the highest), 1 Lyga (second-tier), and 2 Lyga (third-tier), which comprises several zones. 1991 was a transitional year: it was decided to adopt western fall-spring model. Therefore the season lasted only one round from March to June. Prior to that there was the 1990 Baltic League

A Lyga

Regular season

Standings

Results

Championship play-off

Semifinals

Third place match

Final

1 Lyga

2 Lyga

Zone West

Zone East

References
 
 

LFF Lyga seasons
1
Lith
Lith
LFF